The national flag of Mauritius, also known as the Four Bands and Les Quatre Bandes (French for "the four bands"), was adopted upon independence, 12 March 1968.  It consists of four horizontal bands of equal width, coloured (from top to bottom) red, blue, yellow, and green. The flag was recorded at the College of Arms in London on 9 January 1968.

The flag was designed by Gurudutt Moher whose contribution was recognised posthumously in March 2018 in the form of the national title Member of the Star and Key of the Indian Ocean (MSK). Moher, who was a retired school teacher, died of a heart attack on 7 October 2017, at the age of 93.

The civil ensign (for private vessels) and government ensign (for state vessels) are red and blue flags, respectively, each with the national flag in the canton and the coat of arms of Mauritius in the fly.

The naval ensign (used by coast guard vessels) is an unusual design consisting of red, white, and blue vertical stripes of unequal widths defaced by a central anchor/key emblem.

Colours
The flag of Mauritius consists of red, blue, yellow and green bands which officially stand for:

 Red represents the struggle for freedom and independence.
 Blue represents the Indian Ocean, in which Mauritius is situated.
 Yellow represents the light of freedom shining over the island.
 Green represents the agriculture of Mauritius and its colour throughout the 12 months of the year.

In an attempt to unite the nation, especially following the deadly and divisive riots of 1965 and those of 1968, the colours also have political origins. Indeed, the colours also represent the main political parties which existed at the time, namely:

 Red: Parti Travailliste, a social-democrat party
 Blue: PMSD, conservative
 Yellow: IFB, socialist, Indo-Mauritian
 Green: CAM, Islamist

The official colour codes of the flag are in accordance with the Mauritius Standard Bureau.

Colour; Pantone Fashion home cotton
 Red 18-1664TC or 185 C
 Blue 19-3939TC or 295 C
 Yellow 14-0957TC or 116 C
 Green 17-6030TC or 356 C

Sizes
The official sizes of the flag are in accordance with the Mauritius Standard Bureau; standard MS.1-1:2011. The flag size is in the ratio of 2:3.

Historical flags

See also
 List of Mauritian flags

References

External links

Flag
Flags of Africa
Rainbow flags
Flags introduced in 1968
National flags